Shiva, known by his screen name Sathish Ninasam, is an Indian actor who appears in Kannada films. Having made his film debut with Madesha (2008), Sathish appeared in small but significant roles in films like Manasaare (2009), Pancharangi (2010), Lifeu Ishtene (2011) and Anna Bond (2012). He shot to fame after his performance in Drama (2012). Sathish marked his debut as a hero in his 2013 film Lucia, which received critical acclaim nationally and internationally. His performance received rave reviews all over India.

Career

Theatre 
Sathish began acting in street plays and gave more than a hundred shows in hundreds of villages and towns. He soon joined an amateur theatre group called 'Janadhani'. His first play from the troop was 'Smashana Kurukshetra', written by Kuvempu, in which he played 'Dharmaraya'. Sathish's life changing moment was when he joined Ninasam, a theatre institute in Heggodu, Shimoga district of Karnataka, where  he completed a diploma course in acting. Following the course, he performed in several plays giving more than a hundred  shows, across Karnataka, before landing in Bangalore in 2006. Indian literature and World literature has inspired him in his work and his life.

Film
Following his theatre career, Sathish appeared in Kannada TV soaps such as Paramapada, Takadimitha etc.  After his stint in television for a year, he started his career in films in 2008, when he was offered a role in Madesha. He then appeared in small but significant roles in films like Manasaare, Pancharangi, Lifu Ishtene and Anna Bond. His role in Drama won him a nomination for SIIMA Award.  Sathish marked his debut as a hero in the critically acclaimed psychological drama film Lucia, in 2013. The film premiered at the London Indian Film Festival  in July 2013 and won the best film award and his performance won him accolades from critics and audiences. 

Sathish's next releases of 2014 were Anjada Gandu (2014) and Kwatle Satisha (2014), both of which won him praise from critics.

His next film Love in Mandya was released on 28 November 2014 which won the hearts of the audiences. He was nominated for Best Actor SIIMA 2015, IIFA Utsavam Awards 2015 for Best Actor and won the Santosham Film Awards 2015 for Best Hero. In 2015 November, he made his mark as a producer with the release of his film Rocket  under the banner Sathish Picture House. He also played the lead in the film which won him the SIIMA Award 2016 for Best Actor (Critics). 

The films that followed were Beautiful Manasugalu (2017) which was critically acclaimed. His film Ayogya (2018) was a box office success. He won the Filmfare Awards for Best Actor. 

The films that followed were Chambal (2019), Brahmachari (2019), and Petromax (2022).

Filmography

As actor

As producer

As singer

References

External links 
 
 

People from Mandya district
Living people
Male actors in Kannada cinema
Kannada film producers
Year of birth missing (living people)
Film producers from Karnataka
Indian male film actors
21st-century Indian male actors
Male actors from Karnataka